Atomerőmű SE, sometimes shortened to ASE, is a Hungarian professional basketball team based in Paks. The team plays in the Nemzeti Bajnokság I/A, the highest professional league in Hungary. The team was founded in 1979 and has won the Hungarian championship four times.

Honours

Domestic competitions
Nemzeti Bajnokság I/A
Champions (4): 2001–02, 2004–05, 2005–06, 2008–09
Runners-up (4): 2000–01, 2003–04, 2009–10, 2013–14
Magyar Kupa
Winners (4): 2001, 2003, 2005, 2008
Runners-up (3): 2002, 2006, 2012

Current players

Season by season

 Cancelled due to the COVID-19 pandemic in Hungary.

External links
Official website 
Team profile at eurobasket.com

Basketball teams in Hungary